Muricopsis delemarrei is a species of sea snail, a marine gastropod mollusk in the family Muricidae, the murex snails or rock snails.

Distribution
The species is endemic to São Tomé e Príncipe.

References

Further reading
Houart R. 2005. Description of a new species of Muricopsis (Gastropoda: Muricidae: Muricopsinae) from São Tomé, West Africa. Novapex 6: 119–122.

Muricidae
Endemic fauna of São Tomé and Príncipe
Invertebrates of São Tomé and Príncipe
Gastropods described in 2005